The following is a list of the 366 communes of the French department of Haut-Rhin.

The communes cooperate in the following intercommunalities (as of 2020):
CA Colmar Agglomération
CA Mulhouse Alsace Agglomération
CA Saint-Louis Agglomération
Communauté de communes du Centre du Haut-Rhin
Communauté de communes Pays Rhin-Brisach
Communauté de communes du Pays de Ribeauvillé
Communauté de communes du Pays de Rouffach, Vignobles et Châteaux
Communauté de communes de la Région de Guebwiller
Communauté de communes du Ried de Marckolsheim (partly)
Communauté de communes Sud Alsace Largue
Communauté de communes Sundgau
Communauté de communes de Thann-Cernay
Communauté de communes du Val d'Argent
Communauté de communes de la Vallée de la Doller et du Soultzbach
Communauté de communes de la Vallée de Kaysersberg
Communauté de communes de la Vallée de Munster
Communauté de communes de la Vallée de Saint-Amarin

References

Haut-Rhin